

Ludwig Gustav Voltz (28 April 1825, Augsburg - 26 December 1911, Munich) was a German landscape and animal painter. He also did illustrations.

Biography
His father was the painter and engraver, Johann Michael Voltz. His older brother, Friedrich Voltz, was also an animal painter. 

In 1842, he began his art studies at the Academy of Fine Arts, Munich. At first, he was influenced by the battle and genre painter, Peter von Hess but, after studying with Adolf Heinrich Lier, decided to focus on landscapes. His first exhibits were in Vienna, in 1848. His first in Munich came later, in 1854. 

Eventually, he incorporated animals into his landscapes; creating horse portraits for the princely families of Thurn und Taxis and Wallerstein. In the latter part of his career, he specialized in hunting scenes.

He was a member of the Kunstverein München.

References

Further reading 
 Biography @ Arkazia
 Horst Ludwig: Münchner Maler im 19. Jahrhundert Vol.Saffer – Zwengauer. Bruckmann, München 1983, pps.306–308.

External links 

 More works by Voltz @ ArtNet

1825 births
1911 deaths
German painters
German landscape painters
German painters of animals
German illustrators
Academy of Fine Arts, Munich alumni
Artists from Augsburg